Duke Eugen of Württemberg (25 December 1820 – 8 January 1875) was a German prince.

Biography

Early life and family
Duke Eugen was born at Carlsruhe, Kingdom of Prussia, second child and first son of Duke Eugen of Württemberg (1788–1857), (son of Duke Eugen of Württemberg, and Princess Louise of Stolberg-Gedern) and his wife, Princess Mathilde of Waldeck and Pyrmont (1801–1825), (daughter of George I, Prince of Waldeck and Pyrmont and Princess Augusta of Schwarzburg-Sondershausen).

Military career
Eugen was Commander of the 1st Westphalian Hussars No. 8.

Death
Eugen died aged 54. At the time of his death he was second in the line to the throne of Württemberg after Prince William (later King William II).

Marriage and issue 
On 15 July 1843, in Bückeburg, he married Princess Mathilde of Schaumburg-Lippe (1818–1891), daughter of George William, Prince of Schaumburg-Lippe and Princess Ida of Waldeck and Pyrmont.
They had three children:
Duchess Wilhelmine of Württemberg (11 July 1844 – 24 April 1892), married in 1868, Duke Nicholas of Württemberg, no issue.
Duke Eugen of Württemberg (20 August 1846 – 27 January 1877) married in 1874 to Grand Duchess Vera Constantinovna of Russia, had issue.
Duchess Pauline of Württemberg (11 April 1854 – 23 April 1914) married in 1880 to Dr. Melchor Hans Ottokar Willim, had issue.

Honours
Order of the Crown (Württemberg)

Ancestry

Notes and sources
thePeerage.com - Eugen Herzog von Württemberg
The Royal House of Stuart, London, 1969, 1971, 1976, Addington, A. C., Reference: page 222
L'Allemagne dynastique, Huberty, Giraud, Magdelaine, Reference: vol II page 525.

1820 births
1875 deaths
People from the Kingdom of Prussia
Eugen